Mangan may refer to:

 Mangan, India, the capital of the district of North Sikkim in the Indian state of Sikkim
 Mangan in Japanese Mahjong, a type of high scoring hand in Japanese mahjong
 Mangan (surname)
 Mangan, the name of the chemical element manganese in some languages, including German

See also 
 Manga (disambiguation)
 Mangana (disambiguation)